Anna Palaiologina was a queen-consort of the Despotate of Epirus as wife of John II Orsini. She was regent for her son Nikephoros II Orsini in 1337–1338. She later married the Lord of Valona, John Komnenos Asen.

Life
She was a daughter of a Byzantine aristocrat, the  Andronikos Angelos Palaiologos, a grandson of the ruler of Epirus, Michael II Komnenos Doukas, and of the Byzantine emperor Michael VIII Palaiologos. Together the couple had a son, Nikephoros, and a daughter, Thomais. 

She poisoned her husband in 1337, and assumed the regency over her underage son, only for Epirus to be invaded and annexed by the Byzantines in 1338. Anna was carried off as a prisoner to Thessalonica, from where she escaped in 1341. She managed to reach the Epirote capital of Arta, but the local Byzantine governor, John Angelos, placed her under house arrest. 

In  she married the lord of Valona, John Komnenos Asen. Sometime after  she went to live with her daughter Thomais and her son-in-law, Simeon Uroš, at the latter's capital of Trikala.

References

Sources
 

14th-century births
14th-century deaths
Consorts of Epirus
Anna
Greek women of the Byzantine Empire
14th-century Byzantine people
14th-century women rulers
Poisoners
Prisoners and detainees of the Byzantine Empire
14th-century Byzantine women